Ankala is a village in Idar Taluka of the Sabarkantha district of Gujarat, India. It is near Idar and Himatnagar.

References 

Villages in Sabarkantha district